Ashland Park is a historic early 20th century neighborhood in Lexington, Kentucky, United States. It was named after Ashland, the estate of Kentucky statesman Henry Clay which is located in the eastern portion of the neighborhood. The  development was designed by the famous landscape architecture firm the Olmsted Brothers of Massachusetts. The neighborhood belongs to the National Register of Historic Places.

Prominent architectural styles of houses and apartment buildings in the neighborhood include American Foursquare, American Craftsman, Colonial Revival, and Tudor Revival.

The neighborhood's boundaries are Ashland Avenue to the west, East Main Street (U.S. Route 25) to the north, Chinoe Road to the east, and Fontaine Road to the south. The commercial district of Chevy Chase borders Ashland Park on the south. In 2000 the population was 1,864.

References

External links
National Park Service: Ashland Park
Ashland Park Neighborhood Association
 http://www.city-data.com/neighborhood/Ashland-Park-Lexington-KY.html

Neighborhoods in Lexington, Kentucky
National Register of Historic Places in Lexington, Kentucky
Historic districts on the National Register of Historic Places in Kentucky
Frederick Law Olmsted works